Droxinavir (also known as SC 55389A) was an experimental protease inhibitor researched by Pharmacia as a treatment for HIV infection. Its research and development was discontinued on March 06, 1995.

References

Abandoned drugs
Secondary alcohols
Carboxamides
HIV protease inhibitors
Ureas
Tert-butyl compounds